Polkadot Cadaver is an American band formed by members of the Rockville, Maryland, rock band Dog Fashion Disco. The band is stylistically similar to Dog Fashion Disco and inherited many of their fans.

History

Inception and Purgatory Dance Party
Polkadot Cadaver formed shortly after the breakup of Dog Fashion Disco in 2007. Their debut album, Purgatory Dance Party, was released via internet pre-sales on November 17, 2007, with a street date of November 27, 2007. Two Polkadot Cadaver demos were featured on the Dog Fashion Disco rarities album, Beating a Dead Horse to Death... Again in 2008.  During the tours for Purgatory Dance Party, Dave Cullen was brought on as the band's full-time bassist, and in 2010, Scott Radway became the full-time live drummer.

Sex Offender and subsequent tours
On May 5, 2011, Polkadot Cadaver debuted at No. 17 on the Billboard New Artist Chart (aka Heatseeker's Chart) with their second album Sex Offender. This album was the first to include bassist David Cullen (also of Knives Out!), though Ensminger still played drums on the album. In support of the album, they toured with Wednesday 13, Vampires Everywhere! and Korpiklaani. In January 2012 they toured as main support for Wayne Static, and in April began the Fight to Unite Tour in support of Brokencyde and Blood on the Dance Floor with other supporting acts including Deuce, William Control, and The Bunny The Bear.

Last Call in Jonestown and Christmas EP
On July 17, 2012, the band uploaded a picture to their official Facebook page, announcing a new album to be released in 2013 and that fellow Maryland-based rock band Clutch's lead singer Neil Fallon is to appear on a track titled "Transistors of Mercy". Additionally, drummer Scott Radway is present in the picture as a full-time member of the band (he had toured with the band since 2010). The band announced in December that the album would be released in April 2013 and a tour will follow. In early January 2013 it was revealed through the band's Facebook that the new album would be called Last Call in Jonestown and was scheduled for release on May 7. However, the release date ended up being pushed back to May 14. On March 23, the band began the "Our Tour can Beat up your Tour Tour" supporting Psychostick alongside Downtown Brown.

Dave Cullen quit the band before the album was completed, contributing on only two songs. Former Dog Fashion Disco bassist Brian White replaced Dave Cullen for the tour and has stuck with the band since. In support of the album, the band began their "Last Call in Jonestown 2013 Tour" on June 14, supported by One-Eyed Doll and Exotic Animal Petting Zoo. It is the first tour the band has headlined in over two years.

The band began recording a Christmas EP in early September 2013, titled From Bethlehem to Oblivion. The artwork was released on September 5, and pre-orders began October 31. In addition, Last Call in Jonestown has been released on colored vinyl in a limited run of 500 copies.

In April 2014, Scott Radway left the band. Former DFD drummer Mike Oliver joined the band in his place, but since leaving DFD in August 2015, he has had no contact with vocalist Todd Smith, indicating that he is no longer a member of Polkadot Cadaver as well. Former drummer John Ensminger is set to drum on the next Polkadot Cadaver album.

Get Possessed
The band released their fourth album, Get Possessed, on November 17, 2017. The record release party for the album was held at The Agora in Cleveland on November 4, 2017.

Music videos
March 2008 saw the release of the band's first two videos, "Chloroform Girl" and "Pure Bedlam for Halfbreeds", which are available on the band's official MySpace page. Both videos were directed by Dan Edwards. A video has also been produced for "Bring Me the Head of Andy Warhol", which was available on YouTube. It has since been taken down. However was recently uploaded onto the YouTube Channel Kennison Swah so the music video for "Bring me the Head of Andy Warhol" is no longer "lost" it has been put back up on Youtube.

Members
Current
Todd Smith — Vocals, Guitar (2007–Present)
Jasan Stepp — Guitar, Keyboards, Programming (2007–Present), Bass (2007–2008, 2013)
Brian "Wendy" White — Bass (2013–Present)
John Ensminger — Drums (2007–2010, 2015–2022); Studio Drums only (2010–2011, 2022-Present )
Alex Crowley — Drums (2008, 2022-Present)

Former
Mike Oliver — Drums (2014–2015)
David Cullen — Bass (2008–2013) 
Scott Radway — Drums (2010-2014)
Mike Smirnoff — Drums (2014)

Timeline

Discography

References

External links
 Polkadot Cadaver on Myspace
 
 Band Interview

American avant-garde metal musical groups
American experimental musical groups
Heavy metal musical groups from Maryland
Musical groups established in 2007